The Blyth Shipbuilding & Dry Docks Company Ltd. was a British shipyard located in Blyth, Northumberland, England.

Company history

Early history
Shipbuilding began on the site on the south bank of the River Blyth in 1811. In the 1840s the yard was purchased by Beaumont and Drummond. In 1863 the yard was taken over by Hodgson and Soulsby who repaired and built small wooden sailing ships. In 1880 the first two iron ships were built at Blyth for the Russian Government.

Foundation
On 2 March 1883 the Blyth Shipbuilding & Dry Docks Company Ltd. was registered as a limited liability company. It built cargo liners, tramp steamers and colliers. The fifth ship built at the yard was for the shipping company Stephens and Mawson of Newcastle. Daniel Stephens eventually became a Director, and then the Chairman of the company.

World War I
In 1914 a cargo ship under construction was purchased by the Admiralty and converted into the Navy's first seaplane carrier .

Post-war slump and closure
Post-war the company returned to the civilian market building steamers and colliers. However, after Daniel Stephens death on 19 March 1925, and the collapse of the freight market, the yard was closed. In November 1926 Robert Stanley Dalgleish, a Newcastle shipowner, purchased the yard, and changed its name to the Cowpen Dry Docks and Shipbuilding Company. The yard was later amalgamated with Ritson's Shipbuilding and Engineering Company. After completing a number of ships, the yard closed again in 1930.

Reopening and World War II
In mid-1937 the yard was reopened under its original name. During World War II the Blyth company built five  and two s, seven s, as well as two s and ten s. The former German cargo ship Hannover was also converted into the escort carrier .
Hansard records on 8 December 1943 that a question was put to the First Lord of the Admiralty that a director of Blyth Shipyard and an Admiralty official, was convicted of fraudulently altering a tender to the extent of £12,000 enabling the shipyard to secure a contract.

Decline and final closure
By 1947 the company was owned by Mollers (Hong Kong) Ltd. It had four berths and five dry docks. Turbine-driven cargo-liners were built for Moller's subsidiary the Lancashire Shipping Company. In 1949 eleven tankers were built for a number of different companies. In 1954 the main berth of the yard was extended to 550 feet in order to build larger tankers and ore carriers. In 1961 four coastal steamers were completed for Stephenson Clarke, along with another for William Cory and Son.

Unfortunately rising costs and falling orders meant that, after losing money for five years, the yard was finally closed in 1967. Repair work and shipbreaking was then carried out by various companies on the site. Eventually the shipbuilding berths were demolished to make room for a paper and timber storage area for the Port of Blyth.

Shipping owners commissioning new tonnage
List representing some of the owners commissioning new tonnage -

Admiralty, Ampol Petroleum, Barberrys Steamship Co Ltd, Bulk Oil Steamship Co Ltd, Commonwealth of Australia, Companhia de Navegacao, Corporation of Trinity House, Wm. Cory & Son ltd, Dalhousie Steam & Motor Ship Co Ltd, Eagle Oil & Shipping Co Ltd, Elder Dempster Co Ltd, J & C Harrison Ltd, J Ludwig Mowinckel's Rederi A/S, A.P. Moller, Nomikos Ltd, Olsen & Ugelstad, Pacific Steam Navigation Co, Polish Ocean Lines, Rederi A/B Helsingborg, The St Denis Shipping Co Ltd, Stephenson Clarke Ltd, Straits Steamship Co Ltd, Trader Line Ltd, Vilhelm Torkildsen and Wahl & Co.

Facilities
Dry Docks

 376 ft by 52 ft
 314 ft 8 ins by 50 ft 6 ins
 467 ft 10 ins by 60 ft
 338 ft 9 ins by 44 ft 10 ins
 311 ft by 46 ft

Building Berths

 350 ft by 50 ft
 370 ft by 54 ft
 694 ft 9 ins by 95 ft
 566 ft by 90 ft

References

External links
 View of Blyth Shipyard in 1958

Defunct shipbuilding companies of the United Kingdom
Companies based in Northumberland
Blyth, Northumberland
Vehicle manufacturing companies established in 1883
Vehicle manufacturing companies disestablished in 1967